Walther Stampfli (3 December 1884 in Büren, Solothurn – 11 October 1965) was a Swiss politician and member of the Swiss Federal Council (1940–1947).

He was elected to the Federal Council on 18 July 1940 and handed over office on 31 December 1947. He was affiliated to the Free Democratic Party (FDP/PRD). 

During his time in office he was in charge of the Federal Department of Economic Affairs and was President of the Confederation in 1944.

Between 1921 and 1940, he worked in the management of Ludwig von Rollschen Eisenwerke. In 1922, he presided the parliament of the Canton of Solothurn. Between 1930 and 1940, Stampfli was a member of the Swiss National Council.

Stampfli was a citizen of Aeschi.

References
 Georg Hafner: Bundesrat Walther Stampfli (1884-1965). Leiter der Kriegwirtschaft im Zweiten Weltkrieg. Bundesrätlicher Vater der AHV. Dietschi, Olten 1986

External links

Walther Stampfli in History of Social Security in Switzerland

Swiss Diplomatic Documents (DDS)
 

1884 births
1965 deaths
People from Dorneck District
Swiss Calvinist and Reformed Christians
Free Democratic Party of Switzerland politicians
Members of the Federal Council (Switzerland)
Members of the National Council (Switzerland)
University of Göttingen alumni
University of Zurich alumni